The 2021–22 season will be Al-Minaa's 46th season in the Iraqi Premier League, having featured in all 48 editions of the competition except two. Al-Minaa are participating in the Iraqi Premier League and the Iraq FA Cup.

Al-Mina'a will be looking to wrestle back the title they won in the 1977–78 season.

Review

Background

Squad

Transfers

In

Out

Personnel

Technical staff
{| class="toccolours"
!bgcolor=silver|Position
!bgcolor=silver|Name
!bgcolor=silver|Nationality
|- bgcolor=#eeeeee
|Manager:||Qusay Munir ||
|- 
|Assistant coach:||Uday Omran||
|- bgcolor=#eeeeee
|Assistant coach:||Taiseer Abdul-Hussein ||
|- 
|Assistant coach:||Ihsan Hadi||
|- bgcolor=#eeeeee
|Goalkeeping coach:||Ali Hussein Jalil||
|- 
| Fitness coach:||Ali Mohammed||
|-bgcolor=#eeeeee
| Team doctor:||Fares Abdullah||
|-
|Sport consultant:||Rahim Bakr||
|-bgcolor=#eeeeee
|Team supervisor:||Jihad Madlool||
|-
|Administrator:||Salah Khalil||
|-

Board members
{| class="toccolours"
!bgcolor=silver|Position
!bgcolor=silver|Name
!bgcolor=silver|Nationality
|-bgcolor=#eeeeee
|President:||Mohammad Jaber Al-Jaberi||
|-
|Secretary:||Taher Balas||
|-bgcolor=#eeeeee
|Treasurer:||Ali Kadhim Mubarak||
|-
|Member of the Board:||Nazar Taha Humoud||
|- bgcolor=#eeeeee
|Member of the Board:||Jihad Madlool Obaid||
|- 
|Member of the Board:||Ahmed Hamed Al-Jaberi||
|-bgcolor=#eeeeee
|Member of the Board:||Nabeel Abdul Ameer Jamil||
|- 
|Member of the Board:||Jalil Hanoon||
|- bgcolor=#eeeeee
|Member of the Board:||Hani Abed Waleed||
|-

Stadium
During the previous seasons, the stadium of Al-Mina'a was demolished. A company will build a new stadium that will be completed in the end of 2021. Since the team can't play their games at Al Mina'a Stadium, they will be playing at Basra Sports City during this season.

Pre-season and friendlies

Competitions

Overview

Premier League

League table

Matches

FA Cup

Squad statistics

Goalscorers

Last updated: 3 July 2022

External links
 IPFL
 Results of Al-Minaa SC on a FIFA.COM 
 Iraqi League 2021/2022

References 

Al-Mina'a SC seasons